Varhaugvika is a village in Aukra Municipality in Møre og Romsdal county, Norway. It is located on the eastern side of the island of Gossa along the Julsundet strait, just north of the village of Aukrasanden. The municipal centre of Aukra is at Falkhytta, just south of Varhaugvika.

Since 2002, Varhaugvika has been considered a part of the Aukrasanden urban area, so its population is no longer tracked separately.

References

Aukra
Villages in Møre og Romsdal